Uglem is a surname. Notable people with the surname include:

Gerald Uglem (born 1947), American politician
Kari Uglem (born 1970), Norwegian cross-country skier
Mark Uglem (born 1951), American politician